Jan-Andrew Henderson (1962-) is a Scottish author of 33 children's, teen, YA, and adult fiction and non-fiction books. Though mainly a thriller writer, he is best known for helping to popularize Edinburgh's Underground City and its supernatural lore, especially the Mackenzie Poltergeist in Greyfriars Graveyard.
Henderson was instrumental in bringing Edinburgh's forgotten Underground City to public attention, with the first-ever book on the subject The Town Below the Ground, followed by Secret City. His book on supernatural Edinburgh the City of the Dead helped cement the town's haunted reputation while the Ghost That Haunted Itself and Father Figure catapulted the unknown Mackenzie Poltergeist to fame, as one of the world's best-documented supernatural cases. He is also the founder of City of the Dead a ghost tour company which takes visitors into the Underground City and explores the Mackenzie Poltergeist in Greyfriars Graveyard.

Awards
Henderson's fiction thrillers have been shortlisted for thirteen literary awards, including the Royal Mail Award the RED Prize, the Manchester Book Award, the Waterstones Children's Book Prize, the Angus Book Award, the South Lanarkshire Book Award, the Bolton Book Prize, the Fantastica Award, the Stockport Book Prize and the Leeds Book Prize. He is the winner of the Doncaster Book Award and the Royal Mail Award – Britain's biggest children's book prize. His novels have been published in the UK, USA, Canada, Australia, Germany, and the Czech Republic.

Bibliography
Non Fiction (as Jan-Andrew Henderson)
 Edinburgh's Literary Heritage and How It Changed the World (Amberley Press 2021)    
 Edinburgh New Town (Amberley Press 2018)    
 The Royal Mile: A Comprehensive Guide (Amberley Press 2017)    
 Black Markers (Amberley Press 2015)  
 The Ghost That Haunted Itself (Mainstream Publishers 2001)
 The Emperor's New Kilt (Mainstream Publishers 2000)
 The Town Below The Ground (Mainstream Publishers 1999)
 Edinburgh: City of the Dead (Black & White 2004)
 Who Wants to be an Edinburger? (Black & White 2004)
 The Wee Book of Edinburgh (Black & White 2004)
Source:

Fiction (As J A Henderson)
 The Knight With 1,000 Eyes (Black Hart 2021)
 I Don't Really Get Jan-Andrew Henderson (Black Hart 2020)
 Carnage (Black Hart 2020)
 A Town Called Library (Black Hart 2020)
 Father Figure (Black Hart 2020)
 Hide (Black Hart 2019)
 Goners (Black Hart 2019)
 Burnt Out (Black Hart 2019)
 It's Only The End of the World (Floris Books 2018)
 Henry V (Collins Big Cat 2017)
 Time Runs Out (Oxford University Press Project X Series 2016). 
 The Beasts of Blackwater (Oxford University Press Project X Series 2015)  
 The 9th Battalion (Oxford University Press Project X Series 2015)  
 The Fear Machine (Oxford University Press Project X Series 2015) 
 Time Trip (Oxford University Press Project X Series 2015)  
 Colony (Oxford University Press 2009)
 Storm Chasers (Oxford University Press Project X series 2009)  
 Swing (Oxford University Press 2009)
 Crash (Oxford University Press 2008)
 Bunker 10 (Oxford University Press 2007)
 Hunting Charlie Wilson (Oxford University Press 2005)
 Secret City (Oxford University Press 2004)
Source:

References

1962 births
Living people
21st-century Scottish writers